The Central Scottish Amateur Football League is a football (soccer) league competition for amateur clubs in the Central Belt of Scotland.  It was formed in 1927 and is sponsored by Foster's Lager.  The association is affiliated to the Scottish Amateur Football Association.  As a stand-alone Association and not part of Scotland's pyramid system, the Premier Division does not act as a feeder league and as such there is currently no promotion available.

The Central Scottish AFL are the current holders of the John Smiths Inter League Trophy.

League set-up

The Central Scottish AFL is split into two divisions, a Premier Division of 12 teams and a 24-strong Division One (split into Division 1A and 1B).  The bottom two teams from the Premier League are automatically relegated to Division 1, being replaced by the winners of each of the two sections, and the team which finishes 3rd from bottom is entered into a round-robin playoff with the two teams who finished second in each of Division 1A and Division 1B - the winner secures a place in the Premier Division.  Division One sections are determined by a draw at the association's Annual General Meeting.

Member clubs 

The Central Scottish AFL was composed of thirty-six member clubs, listed below in their respective divisions:

Premier Division
Bannockburn AFC
Cambusnethan Talbot AFC
Campsie Minerva AFC
Colville Park AFC
Drumchapel AFC
Eastfield AFC
Greenock HSFP AFC
Harestanes AFC
Southside AFC
Steins Thistle AFC
St Patricks FP AFC
Wishaw HSFP AFC

Division 1A
Arthurlie AFC
Bearsden AFC
Blantyre Celtic AFC
Clydebank AFC
Drumchapel United PYM AFC
Falkirk Community AFC
FC Clydebank
Gartcosh United AFC
Gourock Athletic AFC
Stedfast KAFC
Tullibody Community AFC
Uddingston Anvil AFC

Division 1B
Ardencaple AFC
Blantyre RGM AFC
Bridgewater AFC
BSC Glasgow AFC
Craigneuk AFC
East Kilbride AFC
EDU Sport Academy FC
Fallin AFC
Garrowhill Thistle AFC
Mill United AFC
Newton Vale AFC
Third Lanark AFC

Cup competitions

As well as the league, the association administers three cup competitions for teams in membership: the Cinema Cup, the League Cup (the Bunrigh Trophy) and the McAvoy and McIntyre Trophy.

National and district cups

In addition, member clubs are also likely to play in the Scottish Amateur Cup and one of the two district cups (East or West).  Below are teams who have won these trophies, whilst playing in the Central Scottish AFL.

Scottish Amateur Cup
1992–93 Bankhall Villa AFC
1995–96 Bellshill YMCA AFC
2001–02 Harestanes AFC
2002–03 Harestanes AFC
2006–07 Drumchapel United F.C.
2007–08 Eddlewood AFC
2009–10 Eddlewood AFC
2010–11 Wishaw HSFP
2012–13 Wellhouse AFC
2014–15 Harestanes AFC
2015–16 Colville Park A.F.C.
2016–17 Colville Park A.F.C.

West of Scotland Amateur Cup
1951–52 Gartsherrie United AFC
1988–89 Knightswood AFC
1990–91 Bellshill YMCA AFC
2003–04 Wellhouse AFC
2004–05 Drumchapel United AFC
2005–06 Drumchapel United AFC
2007–08 Drumchapel United AFC
2009–10 Harestanes AFC
2010–11 Drumchapel United AFC

2019/20 St Patrick's FP AFC

East of Scotland Amateur Cup
2000–01 Spartans AFC
2001–02 Aberforth Rangers AFC
2002–03 Aberforth Rangers AFC
2003–04 Tullibody AFC

References

External links
Website of the Central Scottish AFL
Website of the Scottish Amateur FA

Football leagues in Scotland
Sports leagues established in 1927
1927 establishments in Scotland
Amateur association football in Scotland